is a famous  story, a form of Japanese spoken entertainment. It has a simple story, with the most humorous part being the repetition of a ridiculously long name. It is often used in training for  entertainers.

Plot
A couple could not think of a suitable name for their newborn son. The father went to the local temple and asked the chief priest to think of an auspicious name. The priest suggested "Jugemu", and several other names. The father could not decide which name he preferred, and therefore, gave the baby all of the names.

Jugemu's full name is:

(the NHK  version, partially replaced with kanji)

In one version of the tale, Jugemu got into a fight with a friend one day, and the friend suffered a large bump on his head. In protest, he went crying to Jugemu's parents. However, due to the amount of time it took to recite his name, by the time he finished, the bump on his head had already healed.

Another version states that Jugemu fell into a well and drowned; everyone who had to pass along the news spent a lot of time reciting his entire name. In yet another variant, Jugemu fell into a lake, and his parents barely arrived in time to save him.

Interpretation of Jugemu's name
Each part of Jugemu's name that the priest had suggested has an auspicious meaning:

 Jugemu
 "limitless life".
 Gokō-no Surikire
 "five  of rubbing off (the rock)". In Japanese Buddhist lore, a heavenly maiden would visit the human world once in every three thousand years, leaving friction marks on a huge rock with her dress. Eventually, the rock would wear down to nothing in the span of one , or 4 billion years. The priest thus blesses the child to live at least 20 billion years, essentially for eternity.
 Kaijarisuigyo
 "gravel in the sea and fish in water". The amount of gravel and number of fish in the world is meant to represent the degree of the child's luck and fortune.
 Suigyōmatsu
 "where water eventually goes". Because water is free to go anywhere, the child is blessed with boundless well-being wherever he goes.
 Unraimatsu
 "where clouds originally come". Because clouds come from anywhere, this is similar to the above.
 Fūraimatsu
 "where wind originally comes". Similar to the above.
 Kuunerutokoro
 "places to eat and sleep". It is fortunate to have both food and shelter at any time.
 Sumutokoro
 "places to live". Same as above.
 Yaburakōji-no burakōji
 "Ardisia japonica (marlberry) bushes in Yabura Trail".
 Paipo, Shūringan, Gūrindai, Ponpokopii, Ponpokonā
 These are invented names of a kingdom and royal family in Ancient China. Paipo was a rich and peaceful kingdom, where King Shūringan and Queen Gūrindai reigned. They gave birth to Princess Ponpokopii and Princess Ponpokonā, and all of them enjoyed longevity.
 Chōkyūmei
 "long and lasting life".
 Chōsuke
 "blessed for a long time".

History

Japanese folklore studies classify "Jugemu" as a variant of tale type The Child with a Long Name. In the English speaking world, children's literature of this type is known by the titles "Tikki Tikki Tembo" and "Nicki Nicki Tembo".

An early version of this type is "" ('Sunk down the waters for greed'), in a book of jokes published in 1703, created by  comedian Yonezawa Hikohachi. In it, a stepmother renames her sons. The stepson whom she hates is given a short name , and her precious own son given a long . One day,  falls into a river, but people swiftly rescue him. Another day, the mother's own son is swept by the river. She cries "Somebody, please!  is drowning!", but the boy is lost to the river as no-one comes to save him due to the time it takes her to say his name. Both names are garbled forms of phrases taken from Sino-Japanese readings of Chinese Buddhist sutras. The punchline is a Japanese pun involving the word .

A book of horror stories published in 1805 contains "" ('A tale of a man who named his son with a strange name, and regretted it'). In it, a man wishes to name his first son with a unique and long name. He consults a Confucian scholar, who recommends the name . A tutor of Japanese poetry sneers at this, opposing such use of foreign language to name a Japanese's son. The tutor proposes , a traditional poem of good fortune. The scholar and the tutor starts quarrelling, so the father decides to make the name by himself. He solemnly declares it will be
.

One day, the boy falls into a well. People panic to rescue the boy, but for every message they recite the long name. The boy dies, "blue and swollen".

The name by the Confucian is taken from a translated Chinese Confucian textbook about Great Learning. The poem that the tutor referred to, in its original form , is a palindrome of Japanese morae (similar to syllables). The story gives no explanation of the origin or meanings of "Tekitekini". The book was written by a storywriter and storyteller with pen name Tozuisha.

The name "Jugemu" appears in a 1884 magazine article, and the full story in a 1912 book. Another 1912 document suggests that the  story of "Jugemu" may have existed by the mid-19th century.

According to a memoire published in 1927, there was another  performed around the 1880s. In it, the first child is named by a Shinto priest, but dies in infancy; the parents ask a Buddhist priest to name their second child. The name is  The name is taken from a dharani (Buddhist chants in Sanskrit) in Lotus Sutra chapter 26. One day the child falls into a well and drowns; the punchline is a black humor relating Buddhist chants to Japanese funerals. This version is titled "". By the mid-20th century, it was no longer performed.

"Jugemu" was on a 1926 newspaper's radio broadcast program, with the full name printed. There was another broadcast in 1932, this time for children, and the name printed on newspaper again. The story is told in children's magazines from as early as 1926. Even a prominent Japanese dictionary  describes the full name, since its 1991 edition. Television stations broadcast it also in children's programs. In 2003, NHK children's TV program  ("Let's play with Japanese language") featured a game of reciting the name from memory. The program proved popular. There were schools that make all pupils memorize and recite it.

Since 2005, several elementary school textbooks include "Jugemu".

Cultural references

Lakitu, the cloud-riding turtle-dropping enemy character of the Super Mario Bros. video game series is called 'Jugemu' in Japanese versions of the game. In a similar reference, the eggs Lakitu drop, which turn into Spinies, are referred to as 'Paipo' in Japan, despite only being referred to as "Spiny's Eggs" or "Spiny Eggs" in English. The spiked balls thrown by Spikes and blown in the air by Ptooies are called  in another reference. Additionally, a Lakitu by the name of Lakilester is named 'Pokopii' in the Japanese version of Paper Mario.

Jugemu's full name is quoted in the song  by Japanese rock band KANA-BOON. 	

Jugemu (#40) is a colossal underground monster appearing to be only a tiny twig with a single leaf on the surface in the video game Star Ocean: Blue Sphere.

"Jugemu-jugemu gokōnosurikire sammy-davis broilerchicken" is the chant Sasami uses to turn into Pretty Sammy in the Japanese anime Magical Girl Pretty Sammy.

In a short included as a DVD extra for the Fullmetal Alchemist: Brotherhood anime series, the character known only by the mononym "Scar" reveals he shares his name with Jugemu; the character King Bradley (who is known to have adopted the name Bradley, originally bearing only the moniker "Wrath") then reveals that it happens to be his real name as well (though Bradley's voice actor repeatedly misses the third "Paipo"). They continue saying it while preparing for battle, until Scar, in reciting the name, accidentally bites his tongue.

Gintama has a monkey whose full name also starts with "Jugemu Jugemu" as an anime-only character, and was known for his vulgar habits. Trying to find a middle ground, the main characters have adopted a very long name which included insults regarding feces, certain species of fish and squid, as well as references to Final Fantasy IV and the Japanese rock duo B'z.

Lucy from Servant x Service also shares the similar fate as Jugemu (having a long name with a similar origin) and when she first reveals her name her co-workers remark that she is a "modern day Jugemu Jugemu".

In Capcom's Phoenix Wright: Ace Attorney - Spirit of Justice (2016), case 4, "Turnabout Storyteller", contains multiple references to different , including Jugemu. A character appearing in the case, Geiru Toneido, also has a dog called Jugemu, named after the story. Later in the game, it is revealed that one of the game's antagonists, Inga Karkhuul Khura'in, in reality has a Jugemu-esque name: Inga Karkhuul Haw'kohd Dis'nahm Bi'ahni Lawga Ormo Pohmpus Da'nit Ar'edi Iz Khura'in III; his middle names are pronounced as "How could this name be any longer or more pompous than it already is?"

Two of the main characters perform it for a kindergarten their son attends.

In Hatsune Miku: Project DIVA Arcade, Miku Flick/02, and Hatsune Miku: Project DIVA Future Tone, a Vocaloid producer named "Vocaliod-P" made a song named "Jugemu Sequencer"  which was inspired by Jugemu. This song has reached the Hall of Fame.

In episode 21 of Kamen Rider Fourze, the  club can be heard practicing Jugemu when JK and Ryusei come to speak to one of the members.

In episode 33 of Tropical-Rouge! Pretty Cure, the five main characters come up with new attack names. Instead of choosing one, they combine them all into a really long attack name with several words from Jugemu's full name being a part of it.

In Overlord, many members of the Goblin Troop are named after Jugemu Jugemu, such as "Gokou", "Unlai", and "Yaburo".

See also
Japanese folktale

Notes

References

External links

Rakugo
Japanese folklore
Japanese literature
Performing arts in Japan
Japanese words and phrases